Matthew Augustus Suberan (born 3 February 1995) is a Caymanian footballer who plays as a midfielder for Cayman Athletic and the Cayman Islands national team.

He has represented the Cayman Islands during a World Cup qualifying match in 2011. Also he has been selected to represent the Cayman Islands in qualifiers ahead of the 2015 U20 world cup in new Zealand.

International career
Suberan made his international debut as a 16-year-old on 11 November 2011 during a 2014 FIFA World Cup qualification – CONCACAF Second Round group match against the Dominican Republic.

Career statistics

References

1995 births
Living people
Association football midfielders
Caymanian footballers
People from Grand Cayman
Cayman Athletic SC players
Cayman Islands Premier League players
Cayman Islands international footballers